An Interesting Story is a 1904 British short  silent comedy film, directed by James Williamson, showing a man so engrossed  in his book he is dangerously oblivious to what happens around him.

References

External links

 

British black-and-white films
British silent short films
Films directed by James Williamson (film pioneer)
1904 comedy films
1904 films
1904 short films
British comedy short films
Silent comedy films